Dynamo Kharkiv is a bandy club based in Kharkiv, Ukraine.

Dynamo Kharkiv won the Ukrainian championship in 2015 by beating Dnipro Dnipropetrovsk in the final by 5–0

Achievements 
  Championship of Ukraine
  Champion(1): 2014/15

  Cup of Ukraine'
  Winner (2): 2014/15, 2015/16

Sources

Bandy clubs in Ukraine
Sport in Kharkiv